Denis Alekseyevich Arlashin (born 21 February 1990) is a Russian former professional football player.

Club career
He made his Russian Football National League debut for FC Rotor Volgograd on 9 July 2012 in a game against FC Tom Tomsk. He also played in the FNL for KAMAZ in the 2015–16 season.

Personal life
He is a twin brother of Andrei Arlashin.

External links
 
 

1990 births
People from Vyazma
Russian twins
Twin sportspeople
Living people
Russian footballers
Association football midfielders
FC Rotor Volgograd players
FC Neftekhimik Nizhnekamsk players
FC KAMAZ Naberezhnye Chelny players
FC SKA Rostov-on-Don players
Sportspeople from Smolensk Oblast